Baishideng Publishing Group (BPG) is a publisher of medical journals based in Pleasanton, California. It was established on January 15, 1993, and originally published only one journal: the Chinese-language Journal of New Digestology (renamed to the World Chinese Journal of Digestology in 1999). Its second journal was the World Journal of Gastroenterology, originally launched in 1995 as the China National Journal of New Gastroenterology. As of 2017, the company published 43 journals, 42 in English and one in Chinese. 

The company joined the Association of Learned and Professional Society Publishers (ALPSP) in 2017. They are also a member of the Open Access Scholarly Publishers Association (OASPA).  All 43 of BPG's journals are members of the Committee on Publication Ethics (COPE).

Baishideng Publishing Group was listed on the 'original' Beall's List of potential predatory open access publishers.  The publisher has persisted in being listed at a successor to Beall's List, Stop Predatory Journals.  BPG was named in a 2019 cover story of The Walrus as a "junk publisher" alongside Scientific Research Publishing, World Academy of Science, Engineering and Technology, and OMICS International.

Journals
BPG used the "F6Publishing system" as of 2017, an integrated web-based platform designed by BPG to facilitate the multiple processes, reviews and approvals involved in academic publishing.

References 

Academic publishing companies
Open access publishers
Publishing companies established in 1993
Book publishing companies based in California
Companies based in Pleasanton, California